Rasmus Lauge Schmidt (born 20 June 1991) is a Danish handball player for Telekom Veszprém and the Danish national team.

He made his debut for Denmark's handball team in 2010, and with them has won World and European Championships. He has previously played for German side THW Kiel and Danish side Bjerringbro-Silkeborg.

Clubs
Lauge began his handball career in Bjerringbro FH. In 2009 he signed a 3-year deal with Bjerringbro-Silkeborg. He signed a 3-year contract with THW Kiel on 28 February 2013, which began with the start of the 2013–2014 season. On 5 May 2015 Lauge signed a 3-year deal  with SG Flensburg-Handewitt.

On 5 March 2018 it was announced that Rasmus Lauge would continue his career with Hungarian side Telekom Veszprém joining the club from the 2019/2020 season. He signed a two-year contract with the club.

Honours
German Championship
: 2014, 2015, 2018, 2019
: 2016, 2017
DHB-Supercup:
: 2013, 2014
: 2015, 2018
Danish Championship:
: 2011, 2012
: 2010
Hungarian Championship
: 2021, 2022
Hungarian Cup
: 2021, 2022
SEHA League
: 2020, 2021, 2022

References

External links

1991 births
Living people
Olympic handball players of Denmark
Handball-Bundesliga players
SG Flensburg-Handewitt players
THW Kiel players
Veszprém KC players
Danish male handball players
Handball players at the 2012 Summer Olympics
Expatriate handball players
Danish expatriate sportspeople in Germany
Danish expatriate sportspeople in Hungary
People from Randers
Sportspeople from the Central Denmark Region